Clogherhead is a fishing village in County Louth, Ireland. Located in a natural bay on the east coast it is bordered by the villages of Annagassan to the north and Termonfeckin to the south. It has a population of 2,145 according to the 2016 census. As a seaside village, its main industries are fishing and farming, and there has been an RNLI lifeboat stationed in the village for over 100 years.

Name
Historically, the village was known simply as Clogher (Clochair) or Killclogher (Cill Chlochair) while the headland was called Clogher Head. Today the headland remains Clogher Head, the village is called Clogherhead and the townland they are in is called Clogher.

The headland has a walking trail from the village along steep sea cliffs to the nearby harbour of Port Oriel (Port Oirialla). At low tide, it is also possible to walk the beach as far as the Boyne Estuary. From the headland and at the harbour there are views of Ireland's east coast from the Mourne and Cooley Mountains in the north as far south as Lambay Island and the Rockabill Lighthouse.

The headland is also the site of the Red Mans Cave, where Cromwellian soldiers are reputed to have put to death a number of Catholic Priests during the time of the Cromwellian Wars of 1649.

Public transport
Bus Éireann route 189 serves Clogherhead, linking it to Drogheda. Most buses operate via Termonfeckin and Baltray though a few go via Grangebellew and Ballymakenny. Drogheda railway station is approximately 13 km distant.

Economy
Clogherhead is a tourist destination, and the village has a sandy Blue Flag beach which extends from near the lifeboat station and on to the Boyne estuary.

Clogherhead hosts the Seafood Rocks festival, a successor to the former Clogherhead Prawn Festival.

Port Oriel is a fishing port with a large fleet, and also the harbour provides a platform for onshore sea fishing for anglers.

Oriel Sea Salt and Oriel Sea Minerals are produced at Clogherhead and have protected designation of origin.

Amenities
The village has two main beaches. Port Beach in the centre of the village is a Blue Flag beach with the Neptune watersports centre which is run by the local council. The centre is the location for Celtic Adventures which provides schools and groups with a range of sports and training services including watersports, archery and climbing. In addition, it is the location for the local RNLI lifeboat station which houses a Mersey class lifeboat, the Doris Bleasdale. The other beach is on the north side of the village and is known as the 'Big Strand'. Both have bathing facilities with a lifeguard on duty at the village beach during summer months.

There are three public houses in the village, as well as a number of restaurants.

Education
Callystown National School (a Catholic school under the trusteeship of the Archbishop of Armagh) has been in "official" existence since 1832. It is located on the north side of the village with access through the estate of John Kirk Park. As of the 21st century, it has approximately 300 pupils and has been extended a number of times to cater for the population growth in the village and an influx of pupils from the surrounding areas.

Sport
As well as fishing and watersports, the local Gaelic Athletic Association club, Dreadnots Gaelic Football Club, have had three senior players in the Louth County team: Pádraig Rath, Anthony Williams, and James Califf. The club reached the Louth senior championship finals in 2012 and 2014 losing to St Patrick's on both occasions.

Links golf courses nearby include Seapoint Golf Club located at Termonfeckin, and County Louth Golf Club (which hosted the Irish Open in 2004 and again in May 2009) located at Baltray. There is also a pitch and putt course. Walshestown clay-pigeon shooting club is near Clogherhead at Murray's Cross.

In popular culture
Clogherhead has been used as a filming location for a number of films, including:
 Perrier's Bounty (Parallel Film Productions, 2008), with Cillian Murphy, Jim Broadbent and Brendan Gleeson
 The Devil's Own (Columbia Pictures, 1997) with Harrison Ford and Brad Pitt
 Captain Lightfoot (Universal Studios, 1955) with Rock Hudson and Barbara Rush

Songs featuring this town include "Is Clogherhead Like it Used to Be".

Notable people
 Albert Cashier (otherwise Jennie Irene Hodgers), was born in Clogherhead and was a soldier in the Union Army during the American Civil War
 Saint Oliver Plunkett reputedly took refuge in a church that once stood in the townland of Killartry in the parish of Clogherhead
 Patrick Anthony Langan-Byrne, WWI flying ace
 Richard Fahey, UK-based racehorse trainer

See also
 List of towns and villages in Ireland
 List of RNLI stations
 Wind power in the European Union

References

External links
 Catholic Parish of Clogherhead & Walshestown
 Callystown National School (archived 2006)
 Clogherhead Development Group (archived 2006)
 Clogherhead Coast Guard (archived 2011)

Towns and villages in County Louth
Headlands of County Louth
Port cities and towns of the Irish Sea
Ports and harbours of the Republic of Ireland
Beaches of County Louth